Ervin Bruce McSweeney (born 8 March 1957) is a New Zealand cricketer. He played 16 One Day Internationals in the 1980s as a wicketkeeper-batsman.

International career
He toured Zimbabwe with a Young New Zealand team in 1984–85, and with the New Zealand senior team he toured Australia in 1985-86 and Sri Lanka in 1986–87, and played in the Austral-Asia one-day series in Sharjah in 1985–86.

Domestic career
McSweeney played first-class cricket between 1979–80 and 1993-94 for Central Districts and Wellington. His top score was 205 not out for Wellington against Central Districts in 1987–88, when he added 341 for the fifth wicket with Gavin Larsen. He captained Wellington in 1982-83 and 1983–84, and from 1988–89 to 1990–91. He also played for Hawke's Bay in the Hawke Cup.

After cricket
He later became Chief Executive of Cricket Wellington, and announced his resignation from that position on 31 August 2007.

References

External links 

1957 births
Living people
New Zealand One Day International cricketers
New Zealand cricketers
Central Districts cricketers
Wellington cricketers
North Island cricketers